Daniel Axtyamov (born 26 March 1985) is an Uzbek-born Azerbaijani former professional footballer.

External links
 
 Aist FC squad 2012
 

1985 births
Living people
Azerbaijani footballers
Azerbaijan international footballers
Shamakhi FK players
AZAL PFK players
FC Torpedo Moscow players
FC Minsk players
Sportspeople from Tashkent
FC Vityaz Podolsk players
Expatriate footballers in Belarus
Azerbaijani expatriate footballers
Expatriate footballers in Russia
Kapaz PFK players
FC Sheksna Cherepovets players
Simurq PIK players
FC Tiraspol players
Expatriate footballers in Moldova
Association football forwards